The cuneiform sign qa, is a common-use sign of the Amarna letters, the Epic of Gilgamesh, and other cuneiform texts (for example Hittite texts). It has a secondary sub-use in the Amarna letters for ka4.

Linguistically, it has the alphabetical usage in texts for q, a, or qa, and also a replacement for "q", by k, or g.

Epic of Gilgamesh usage
The qa sign usage in the Epic of Gilgamesh is as follows: qa-(109 times).

References

Moran, William L. 1987, 1992. The Amarna Letters. Johns Hopkins University Press, 1987, 1992. 393 pages.(softcover)
 Parpola, 1971. The Standard Babylonian Epic of Gilgamesh, Parpola, Simo, Neo-Assyrian Text Corpus Project, c 1997, Tablet I thru Tablet XII, Index of Names, Sign List, and Glossary-(pp. 119–145), 165 pages.

Cuneiform signs